Leonard Thompson may refer to:
 Leonard Thompson (historian) (1916–2004), Yale University professor and writer on South African politics and apartheid
 Leonard Thompson (diabetic) (1908–1935), first person to receive an insulin injection
 Leonard Thompson (businessman) (1914-1976), owner and managing director of Blackpool Pleasure Beach
 Leonard Thompson (golfer) (born 1947), American PGA Tour and Champions Tour professional golfer
 Leonard Thompson (American football) (born 1952), former NFL wide receiver for the Detroit Lions
 Leonard Thompson (footballer) (1901–1968), footballer who played for Arsenal FC

See also
 Len Thompson (1947–2007), Australian rules footballer